Koursera is a village in the Iolonioro Department of Bougouriba Province in south-western Burkina Faso. The village has a population of 672.

References

Populated places in the Sud-Ouest Region (Burkina Faso)
Bougouriba Province